Jesu, meines Glaubens Zier is a German Lutheran hymn by Gottfried Wilhelm Sacer, first published in 1661. Its hymn tune, Zahn No. 6453, was first published in 1714, in Freylinghausen's hymnal.

The tune is also known in English due to its presence in the 1906 English Hymnal and its 1986 successor, where it appears to "It is finished! Christ hath known", a Passion text by Gabriel Gillett written for the 1906 publication and based on Jesus' dying words, per the Gospel of John, "" ("It is finished!"), which have inspired many other hymns.

Text 
The original German text is a Passion hymn in five stanzas of eight lines each. An English-language version of the hymn, not a translation of the original but sharing its rhyme scheme and Passion theme, has three stanzas. The author of that version, who exemplifies the conservative tradition of the beginning of the 20th-century, pleads, in a "very sensitive and beautiful text", for Christ, as maker of human joys and sorrows, to lead his flock upon the same path of self-sacrifice. The poet's tone and theology are medieval in nature, the text as a whole expanding on medieval analogies between Nature and Christian mythology.

German original

English version

Tune 
The hymn tune of "Jesu, meines Glaubens Zier" was first published in Freylinghausen's hymnal in 1714. The setting which appears in  only consists of a vocal line (melody) and a figured bass. A realisation of this was published in the English Hymnal, and this setting is transcribed below.

References

Sources

External links 
 
 BWV 472: Jesu, meines Glaubens Zier at 
 It is finished! Christ hath known, (Jesu Meines Glaubens Zier) in various print and audio formats at 
  (recordings)
 

Lutheran hymns
17th-century hymns in German
Passion hymns